Cleistes is a genus of orchids (family Orchidaceae). It contains approximately 40–50 species, most of them native to South America, with a few species extending north into Costa Rica and Trinidad.
Two North American species were formerly included in this group, but are now regarded as a separate genus, Cleistesiopsis.

References 

  (1840) The Genera and Species of Orchidaceous Plants 409.
  (2003) Genera Orchidacearum 3: 286 ff. Oxford University Press.

External links 
 
 

Vanilloideae genera
Pogonieae
Orchids of Central America
Orchids of South America